Jajala may refer to: 

Jaljala Rural Municipality 
Jaljala, Baglung
Jaljala, Sankhuwasabha